Pedro Luis Domínguez Quevedo (born 7 December 2001), known professionally as Quevedo, is a Spanish rapper and singer. He gained recognition in 2022 with the release of "Bzrp Music Sessions, Vol. 52".

In a period of two years Quevedo has taken four of his singles to number one position in Spain, those being "Cayó la Noche", "Quevedo: Bzrp Music Sessions, Vol. 52", "Apa" and his last "Playa del Inglés" as well as leading other six singles to top 10.

Career 
Pedro Luis Domínguez Quevedo was born in Madrid. At age one, he moved to Brazil and returned to Spain at age five, settling in Las Palmas, the Canary Islands. After venturing into freestyle rap, Quevedo launched his music career in 2020 alongside music producer Linton. His single "Ahora y Siempre" (2021) reached the 19th and second spots on Spotify's Global Viral 50 chart and Spain Viral 50 chart, respectively.

In 2022, he collaborated with Canarian artists Cruz Cafuné and Bejo on the remix version of "Cayó la Noche". Other collaborations include "Fernet" with Rei, "Si Quieren Frontear" with Duki and De La Ghetto and "2step" with Ed Sheeran. In July 2022, he released his breakthrough single "Bzrp Music Sessions, Vol. 52" with Argentine producer Bizarrap. The song was viewed more than 10 million times within the first twenty-four hours of its release. The single became the first song by either an Argentine or a Spanish artist to reach the number-one spot on Spotify's Global Top 200 chart.

Discography

Studio albums

Singles

Promotional singles

Other charted songs

References 

Spanish male rappers
2001 births
Living people
People from Madrid
Singers from the Canary Islands